The Seattle Mariners farm system consists of six Minor League Baseball affiliates across the United States and in the Dominican Republic. Three teams are independently owned, while the Modesto Nuts and two complex-based Rookie level squads playing in the Arizona Complex League and the Dominican Summer League are owned by the major league club.

The Mariners have been affiliated with the Triple-A Tacoma Rainiers of the Pacific Coast League and High-A Everett AquaSox of the Northwest League since 1995, making them the longest-running active affiliations in the organization with the exception of the Rookie Arizona League Mariners.

2021–present
The current structure of Minor League Baseball is the result of an overall contraction of the system beginning with the 2021 season. Class A was reduced to two levels: High-A and Low-A. Low-A was reclassified as Single-A in 2022.

1990–2020
Minor League Baseball operated with six classes from 1990 to 2020. The Class A level was subdivided for a second time with the creation of Class A-Advanced. The Rookie level consisted of domestic and foreign circuits.

1977–1989
The foundation of the minors' current structure was the result of a reorganization initiated by Major League Baseball (MLB) before the 1963 season. The reduction from six classes to four (Triple-A, Double-AA, Class A, and Rookie) was a response to the general decline of the minors throughout the 1950s and early-1960s when leagues and teams folded due to shrinking attendance caused by baseball fans' preference for staying at home to watch MLB games on television. The only change made within the next 27 years was Class A being subdivided for the first time to form Class A Short Season in 1966.

See also
Seattle Mariners minor league players

References

External links
 Major League Baseball Prospect News: Seattle Mariners
 Baseball-Reference: Seattle Mariners League Affiliations

Minor league affiliates